

Theodred was a medieval Bishop of London.

Theodred was consecrated between 909 and 926, probably in 926. He may have been German and was a patron of German clerics, several of whom were beneficiaries of his will. He was close to king Æthelstan throughout his reign, and is reported to have been present at the Battle of Brunanburh in 937. He took messages from the king to his councillors, and is said to have bought relics in Pavia.

Theodred died between 951 and 953.

Citations

References

External links
  -- also covers Theodred I (bishop of Elmham)
 

Bishops of London
950s deaths
Year of birth unknown
10th-century English bishops